Deh-e Baba or Deh Baba may refer to:
 Deh-e Baba, Chaharmahal and Bakhtiari